Duckling Hill, also known as Ap Tsai Shan indigenously, is a hill in the area of Tseung Kwan O, New Territories, Hong Kong.  It is  metres tall. The neighbourhoods of Hang Hau and Po Lam are adjacent to this hill.  There is an outlook area not far from the summit.

See also 
 Geography of Hong Kong
 Clear Water Bay Road

References